Malcolm Kenneth MacMillan (21 August 1913 – 17 November 1978) was a Scottish Labour Party politician and journalist.

At the 1935 general election, at the age of 22, he was elected as the Member of Parliament for the Western Isles. He joined the army in 1939 to fight Hitler's forces. He was re-elected at the next seven general elections, serving as the MP for the constituency for 35 years before losing his seat at the 1970 general election to Donald Stewart of the Scottish National Party (SNP).

In 1972, Macmillan was expelled from the Labour Party after disagreement over the selection of his replacement as Labour candidate, Andrew Wilson. Macmillan stood as a United Labour Party candidate at the February 1974 general election, but finished in fourth place, polling only 6.8% of the vote while the SNP substantially increased their majority.

References 

 Times Guide to the House of Commons February 1974

External links 

1913 births
1978 deaths
Members of the Parliament of the United Kingdom for Scottish constituencies
Scottish Labour MPs
Independent politicians in Scotland
UK MPs 1935–1945
UK MPs 1945–1950
UK MPs 1950–1951
UK MPs 1951–1955
UK MPs 1955–1959
UK MPs 1959–1964
UK MPs 1964–1966
UK MPs 1966–1970
Parliamentary Peace Aims Group